Oak Grove is an unincorporated community in Gulf County, Florida, United States.

Notes

Unincorporated communities in Gulf County, Florida
Unincorporated communities in Florida